A Perfect Contradiction is the third studio album by English recording artist Paloma Faith, released by Sony Music Entertainment on 10 March 2014. Musically, the album is a pop album, with elements of R&B, jazz, soul, Motown and disco. The album received mixed reviews; it spawned six singles; "Can't Rely on You", "Only Love Can Hurt Like This", "Trouble with My Baby", "Ready for the Good Life", "Leave While I'm Not Looking" and "Beauty Remains"; the first two of these charted within the top 10 in the United Kingdom and "Only Love Can Hurt Like This" topped the charts in Australia.

On 15 September 2014, it was announced that a repackaged version of the album, entitled A Perfect Contradiction: Outsiders' Edition, will be released on 10 November 2014, postponed from the original date of 3 November 2014. It features three new songs as well as a rearranged version of "Changing", Faith's collaboration with Sigma.

Background
Paloma Faith had posted pictures of her recording her new album for several months on Instagram. She then announced that her new album would be entitled A Perfect Contradiction. On 13 January 2014 Faith premiered the video for the album's lead single, "Can't Rely on You". The single was produced by Pharrell Williams, who wrote the song along with Faith.

Paloma previewed the song "Love Only Leaves You Lonely" at a June 2013 performance in Liverpool, and has since made the song available as a pre-order preview on the iTunes Store. The song "Only Love Can Hurt Like This" was premiered in a stripped back acoustic version on Amazon, and the song was later performed at a Burberry fashion show in February 2014. 90-second previews of all the songs were made available in February 2014 on iTunes, before Faith streamed the album on SoundCloud via Nylon a few days before the album's release. The album's release was promoted with appearances on various UK radio and TV shows, including a performance on the final of The Voice UK Series 3.

Writing
The second single from the album, "Only Love Can Hurt Like This", was written entirely by Diane Warren, who has written for Faith twice again, towards the single "Leave While I'm Not Looking" (Featured on the outsider's edition of Faith's third studio album "A Perfect Contradiction"), and "The Crazy Ones" (Featured as the main theme of the film "Miss You Already"). "Impossible Heart" was written by Faith and Christopher Braide, who had previously worked with Faith on her second studio album "Fall to Grace" towards the song "30 Minute Love Affair". Both songs used synthesized instrumentation. "Impossible Heart" was not released as a single. "Trouble with My Baby" was originally written with Steve Robson in synchronisation with Faith's previous album Fall to Grace, but was considered by Faith as "inappropriate" or "misfitting" in regards of the theme of Fall to Grace. As a result, the song was saved for a later album, specifically "A Perfect Contradiction".

Critical reception

On Metacritic, which assigns a normalised rating out of 100 to reviews from mainstream critics, A Perfect Contradiction received an average score of 66, which indicates "generally favorable reviews", based on 10 reviews. Digital Spy made this comment and called the album "solid but unsurprising". Further commenting: "There's often a temptation for soul singers to turn out albums full of ballads, so kudos to Paloma for coming up with something lively and largely mid to uptempo. In fact, the Diane Warren-penned 'Only Love Can Hurt Like This' is her only truly big ballad moment; the sumptuous big band production and throaty vocal reminiscent of Dusty Springfield or Sandie Shaw." The album earned 3 stars out of 5 from The Guardian, saying it was "consistent but formulaic: horns plus wailing vocals plus Motown feel start to grate by the end of the record. Faith's voice is all there, but her songwriting calls for added ingenuity."

The Observer gave the album 2 stars out of 5, again making the comment that the album was upbeat but generic, while The Daily Telegraph gave 3 stars out of 5 from, who said "Faith has a nice ear for melody and smart turn of phrase. She sounds like a one woman Phil Spector girl group on Taste My Own Tears, and does a slick, jazzy soul turn on Other Woman. It may be nothing new but her punchy, uplifting set of pastiche Sixties and Seventies soul, r’n’b and disco is perfectly pitched with just an appealing hint of exaggeration." The Independent gave the album 3 stars out of 5, commenting on a lack of originality but complimenting "Can't Rely on You" AllMusic gave the album a very positive review, giving it 4 stars out of 5, calling the production of the album slick and funky, complementing the new musical direction, highlighting the new sound of disco, and '70's soul-influences on the album. Further commented: "Ultimately, it's Faith's irrepressible enthusiasm and unbridled vocal ability that shine the most on A Perfect Contradiction, and having musicians like Pharrell and Saadiq around just works to sweeten the deal."

Commercial performance

A Perfect Contradiction debuted on the UK Albums Chart at number two, beaten by The Take Off and Landing of Everything by Elbow from the top spot. The album spent 29 weeks inside the top 10. On 22 August 2014 the album received a Platinum certification for selling over 300,000 copies in the UK. After the single "Only Love Can Hurt Like This" reached number one in Australia, the album jumped up from number 15 on the charts to its peak at number four, becoming Faith's highest-charting album in that country. The album also peaked at number 8 in Ireland, 17 in New Zealand, 41 in the Netherlands and 91 in Switzerland. "A Perfect Contradiction" became the sixth best selling album of 2014, and the best selling album for a female artist in the UK. It had sold a total of 342,000 copies in the UK as of October 2014. On 20 February 2015 it was certified double platinum for sales exceeding 600,000 copies in the UK.

Singles
The first single from the album, "Can't Rely on You", was written with, and produced by, Pharrell Williams and reached number 10 on the UK Top 40 charts in its first week. It was released on 23 February 2014, although the song had been premiered on YouTube, along with its music video (which is directed by Paul Gore and features Faith speaking in Italian in an elaborate retro introduction), the previous month, and had been playing on UK radio since then. It is Faith's second Top 10 single, following 2012's "Picking Up the Pieces". In late March 2014, Faith announced on her social networking sites that "Only Love Can Hurt Like This" would be the second single from the album. The single's video, directed by Paul Gore, was premiered on 28 April 2014 with the single being released on 11 May 2014. It reached number 6 in the UK Singles Chart becoming Faith's highest-charting single there. In Australia the song peaked at number one, also becoming Faith's highest-charting single there.

The third single, "Trouble with My Baby", was officially confirmed by Faith on 27 June 2014, with the video for the song (directed by Paul Gore) to premiere at midnight on 30 June 2014. The song was later confirmed to have an 11 August 2014 release date. It did not chart within the top 100 on the UK Singles Chart due to lack of promotion. "Ready for the Good Life" was released as the lead single and overall fourth single from the repackaged version of A Perfect Contradiction on 9 November 2014. It reached number 68 on the UK Singles Chart for the week ending 16 November 2014. Although Faith confirmed during her 2014 tour that a video was filmed for the song, it ultimately was not released. "Leave While I'm Not Looking", penned by Diane Warren as a follow-up to Faith's highest-charting single "Only Love Can Hurt Like This", was announced in late November 2014 to be the album's fifth single. The single received minimal promotion and airplay; it also did not receive a music video. "Beauty Remains" was announced in February 2015 to be the sixth single from the album. Faith confirmed that the song was based around love, and as a result of this held a Valentine's Day competition on her social media sites. The song, along with an accompanying music video classified as suitable for those aged 15 and upwards, was released in March 2015, and despite an appearance on the final of The Voice UK, the song did not chart in any territories.

Tour
To promote A Perfect Contradiction, Faith embarked her third concert tour on 23 May 2014, called Paloma Faith Tour. Originally visiting European countries, Faith announced new tour dates for Australia and the United States and a UK arena tour in August through September 2014. The concert tour consisted of a total of 66 dates and ended in Australia on 16 May 2015.

Track listing

Notes
 signifies an additional record producer.
 signifies a vocal producer.
 signifies a co-record producer.
"The Bigger You Love (The Harder You Fall)" is a Sisters Love cover.
At the BBC Proms, Faith did perform fifteen songs, although six were not included in the "Deluxe Outsider's Edition" -see above. The omitted tracks are: "Love Only Leaves You Lonely", "Taste My Own Tears", "Let Me Down Easy" (a Bettye LaVette cover), "All Night Long" (a Keely Smith cover), "Picking Up The Pieces", and the encore, "Freedom".

Personnel
Adapted from AllMusic.

The Dap-Kings – horns
Luke Potashnick – guitar
Sam Miller – engineer
Justin Merrill – engineer
Chris Galland – assistant
Rob Barron – piano
Paloma Faith – background vocals, lead vocals
Seye Adelekan – guitar, background vocals
Tom Rees-Roberts – trumpet, flugelhorn
Tom Hough – engineer
Gharah Degeddingseze – producer, string arrangements, horn arrangements, additional production, instrumentation
Rick Bryant – assistant
Mario Luccy – engineer
Rory More – Hammond B3
Dave Guy – trumpet
Mike Horner – assistant engineer
Plan B – producer
Dave Okumu – producer, instrumentation
Taura Stinson – vocal producer, background vocals
Mike Larson – mixing
Joy Joseph – percussion
Ben Drew – background vocals
Wayne Gordon – assistant
James Gardiner-Bateman – alto saxophone, horn arrangements, baritone saxophone
Kyle Townsend – vocal producer
Alalal – engineer
Christopher Braide – producer
Bryan "Bdub" White – bass
Steve Payne – guitar
Delbert Bowers – assistant
David Standish – photography
Roberto Angrisani – background vocals
Naomi Miller – background vocals
Obenewa Aboah – background vocals
Tom Wright-goss – Bass, Guitar
Kieron McIntosh – organ, keyboards, trumpet, piano, programming, additional production, background vocals
Nick Brown – assistant
Simon Guzman – assistant
Andy Menhenitt – assistant
Komi Hakam – drum programming
Baby N Sola – background vocals
Jerry "JL" Lang – drum programming
Janelle Martin – background vocals
Aisha Shreena – background vocals
Dylan – instrumentation, keyboards, producer
Manny Marroquin – mixing
Andrea Martin – background vocals
Stuart Matthewman – engineer, vocal producer
Raphael Saadiq – producer, instrumentation
John Davis – mastering
Aisha McCray – background vocals
Femio Hernández – mixing assistant, assistant
Geoff Gascoyne – bass
Cochemea Gastelum – baritone saxophone
Joi Gilliam – background vocals
Pharrell Williams – arranger, background vocals, producer, instrumentation
Gerry Brown – engineer
Neal Sugarman – tenor saxophone
A.C. Burrell – producer, horn arrangements, additional production, instrumentation, vocal producer, string arrangements
Andrew Coleman – engineer
Gabriel Roth – horn engineer
Hart Gunther – arranger, digital editing, engineer
Eric Appapoulaye – bass, hammond b3, piano, drums, background vocals, additional production
Trevor Mires – bass trombone, tenor trombone
Dan Parry – mixing
Mr. Hudson – guitar, programming, engineer, producer, drums, percussion
Chris Braide – vocal producer
Betty Wright – background vocals

Charts

Weekly charts

Year-end charts

Decade-end charts

Certifications

Release history

Outsiders' Edition

References

2014 albums
Paloma Faith albums
Albums produced by Raphael Saadiq
Albums produced by Pharrell Williams
Albums produced by Mr Hudson
Albums produced by Steve Robson